Frere is a town in Inkosi Langalibalele Local Municipality in the KwaZulu-Natal province of South Africa. The city is named for Sir Henry Bartle Frere, Governor of Cape Colony from 1877 to 1880. The city was for a time the headquarters of Sir Redvers Buller during the Second Boer War. The town is 25 km east of Winterton.

Sources 
 Erasmus, B.P.J. (1995). Op Pad in Suid-Afrika. Jonathan Ball Uitgewers. .

References

Populated places in the Inkosi Langalibalele Local Municipality